Philip Joseph Duke (1925–1950) was a Gaelic footballer who played for the Cavan county team.

Playing career
Duke was a versatile footballer, he could play as a Half-Back, Midfielder or as a Forward.  Cavan's historic win over Kerry in the 1947 All-Ireland Senior Football Championship final played at the Polo Grounds in New York was arguably P.J. Duke's greatest ever hour. Cavan found themselves eight points down against a Kerry side playing out of their skins. Team-manager Hughie O'Reilly switched P. J. from Midfield to right half back to mark Batt Garvey who had threatened to win the game on his own. The Switch saw an immediate tightening up of the Cavan defence and this changed the entire pattern of the game with the red-haired P.J. Duke making spectacular runs out of defence, and the inter-passing speed and skills of Mick Higgins and Tony Tighe.
He again formed a brilliant half back partnership with Simon Deignan & J. J. O'Reilly to reclaim the title in 1948. He won a National Football League medal in 1949 and he collected a Railway Cup medal with Ulster in 1950. He won three Sigerson Cup medals with University College Dublin.

Death
Duke died while in his prime on 1 May 1950 after a short illness at St Vincent's Hospital in Dublin. He was just 25 years old.

Other honours
 Number 124 in The 125 greatest stars of the GAA
 Selected at right half back in Cavan's 'Team of the Millennium' in December 2000
 Picked for the star-studded Combined Universities team against Rest of Ireland selections in 1949

References

1925 births
1950 deaths
Cavan inter-county Gaelic footballers
Irish dentists
20th-century dentists